Kalo Chorio may refer to the following places:

in Cyprus
Kalo Chorio (Çamlıköy), a village near Lefka
Kalo Chorio (Kapouti), a village near Morphou
Kalo Chorio, Larnaca, a  village near Larnaca
Kalo Chorio, Limassol, a village north of Limassol
Kalo Chorio, Nicosia, a village near Klirou

in Greece
Kalo Chorio, Lasithi, a village in the municipality of Agios Nikolaos, Crete

See also
Chorio, Greece (or Horio), a Greek village in the island of Halki
Xiro Chorio, a borough of the city of Rethymno, on Crete